Jay Haze  is an American recording artist from Avoca, Pennsylvania. 
He records under monikers The Architect, Subversions, The Hoffman Ensemble, Bearback and Fuckpony. 

He had no formal training in music and does not play an instrument. 
Jay co-founded TuningSpork, Contexterrior and the now defunct Textone.org 
with Bjoern Hartmann in the early 2000s

References

American music arrangers
Kitty-Yo artists
People from Luzerne County, Pennsylvania
Year of birth missing (living people)
Living people